Mohammad Zahid (born 25 April 1982) is a Pakistani first-class cricketer who played for Faisalabad cricket team.

References

External links
 

1982 births
Living people
Pakistani cricketers
Faisalabad cricketers
Cricketers from Faisalabad